The Ghost That Walks Alone is a 1944 American comedy mystery film directed by Lew Landers and starring Arthur Lake, Janis Carter and Lynne Roberts.

Main cast
 Arthur Lake as Eddie Grant 
 Janis Carter as Enid Turner 
 Lynne Roberts as Sue McGuire Grant 
 Frank Sully as Beppo 
 Warren Ashe as Whitney Burke 
 Arthur Space as Cedric Jessup 
 Barbara Brown as Milly Westover 
 Matt Willis as Tom Walker

References

Bibliography
 Pitts, Michael R. Columbia Pictures Horror, Science Fiction and Fantasy Films, 1928–1982. McFarland, 2010.

External links
 

1944 films
1940s comedy mystery films
American comedy mystery films
Columbia Pictures films
Films directed by Lew Landers
American black-and-white films
1944 comedy films
1940s English-language films
1940s American films